The 1989–90 Michigan State Spartans men's basketball team represented Michigan State University in the 1989–90 NCAA Division I men's basketball season. The team played their home games at newly-opened Breslin Center in East Lansing, Michigan and were members of the Big Ten Conference. They were coached by Jud Heathcote in his 14th year at Michigan State. The Spartans finished the season with a record of 28–6, 15–3 to win the Big Ten championship by two games. As the No. 3-ranked team in the country, they received the conference's automatic bid to the NCAA tournament as the No. 1 seed in the Southeast region. In the First Round, they narrowly avoided becoming the first No. 1 seed to lose a No. 16 seed, beating Murray State in overtime. They then defeated UC Santa Barbara in the Second Round to earn a trip to the Sweet Sixteen, their first trip since 1986. There they lost in overtime to Georgia Tech.

Ken Redfield was named the Big Ten Defensive Player of the Year.

Previous season 
The Spartans finished the 1988–89 season 18–15, 6–12 to finish in eighth place in Big Ten play. Michigan State received a bid to the National Invitation Tournament. There the Spartans beat Kent State, Wichita State, and Villanova to reach the final four at Madison Square Garden. In the semifinals, they lost to Saint Louis before losing to UAB in the third-place game.

Season summary 
The Spartans were led by junior Steve Smith (20.2 points and 7.0 rebounds, and 4.8 assists per game), senior Kirk Manns (15.5 points per game), and Ken Redfield  (11.6 points per game). The team also featured sophomore Mark Montgomery and freshman Dwayne Stephens who would both later become assistant coaches at Michigan State under Tom Izzo.

MSU began their season by traveling to Alaska to participate in the Great Alaska Shootout. There, they defeated Auburn, Texas A&M, and Kansas State to capture the Shootout championship. They suffered their first loss of the season at UIC after being ranked for the first time that season. Two games later, the Spartans lost at Breslin Center to Bowling Green. They finished their non-conference schedule with an 11–2 record.

Michigan State started the Big Ten season 3–0 before losing to No. 7 Illinois on the road. In a four-game stretch against ranked teams, the Spartans defeated No. 12 Indiana in Bloomington, but lost to rival No. 7 Michigan at home. A loss to No. 19 Minnesota preceded a win over No. 8 Purdue and left the Spartans at 6–3 in the Big Ten. Following the victory over Purdue, MSU entered the AP rankings at No. 23. The Spartans won their remaining nine games to finish the season on a 10-game winning streak. The streak included wins over No. 15 Illinois, No. 25 Indiana, No. 8 Michigan, No. 17 Minnesota, and No. 10 Purdue in a six-game stretch. The finish gave the Spartans the Big Ten championship by two games over Purdue with a 15–3 record and they finished the season ranked No. 3 in the country.

The Spartans received the Big Ten's automatic bid to the NCAA Tournament as a No. 1 seed. In the Tournament, the Spartans narrowly defeated 16th-seeded Murray State, led by Popeye Jones, in overtime to avoid becoming the only No. 1 seed to lose to a 16 seed. They again narrowly defeated ninth-seeded UC Santa Barbara in the Second Round by four points to advance to the Sweet Sixteen for the first time since 1986. In the Sweet Sixteen, the Spartans 12-game winning streak came to end as they lost to fourth-seeded Georgia Tech. The game featured a controversial last second basket by Tech's Kenny Anderson to force overtime where the Spartans fell 80–81.

Roster and statistics 

Source

Schedule and results

|-
!colspan=9 style=| Non-conference regular season

|-
!colspan=9 style=| Big Ten regular season

|-
!colspan=9 style=|NCAA tournament

Rankings

Source.

Awards and honors
 Steve Smith – All-Big Ten First Team

References

Michigan State Spartans men's basketball seasons
Michigan State
Michigan State
Michigan State Spartans men's b
Michigan State Spartans men's b